Fulgence Razakarivony (born August 16, 1963 in Betsiholany) is a Malagasy clergyman and prelate for the Roman Catholic Diocese of Ihosy. He was appointed bishop in 2011.

See also
Catholic Church in Madagascar

References

Malagasy Roman Catholic bishops
Living people
1963 births
21st-century Malagasy people